Normanby Homestead is a heritage-listed homestead at Cunningham Highway, Warrill View, Queensland, Australia. It was designed by Charles Balding and built from 1866 to 1867. It was added to the Queensland Heritage Register on 21 October 1992.

History 
Normanby Homestead was constructed in 1866-67 for the George Thorn family of Ipswich, to a design by Ipswich architect and surveyor, Charles Balding.

The Normanby Plains south of Ipswich, on which the homestead is located, were named by government surveyor Robert Dixon in 1839, and occupied by European pastoralists from the 1840s. Initially, Normanby was part of Rosebrook, a  run on the western side of the Normanby Plains, taken up  by NSW pastoralist Donald McIntyre. In 1845 the Rosebrook lease was transferred to George Thorn of Ipswich. He was the former superintendent of the government cattle station at Limestone from 1838, and one of the earliest free settlers at Moreton Bay. Whilst still a government employee, he had obtained permission to operate a small general store at Limestone, and in 1842 resigned from government service to establish Ipswich's first hotel, the Queen's Arms. Known as the "father of Ipswich", Thorn represented West Moreton in the first Queensland Legislative Assembly. His sons George, Henry, John and William followed their father into Queensland politics, with son George becoming the Premier of Queensland.

In mid-1848, Thorn's property on the Normanby Plains was referred to as Rosebrook.

In September 1866, Ipswich architect Charles Balding called tenders for the construction of a villa residence and outbuildings at Normanby for George Thorn, and it is believed the house was completed in 1867.

In the early 1870s John Thorn managed Normanby Station for his father until the latter's death in 1876. In 1875, the homestead was described as a "pine palace" with a lofty, spacious, splendidly polished, and lined interior. The property was running 20,000 sheep and 2,000 heads of cattle at the time. In 1878, when Normanby station was put up for auction, the homestead consisted of a roomy house with a wrap-around verandah, kitchen, servants' rooms, stables, coachhouse, outbuildings, garden and orchard. The auction was unsuccessful.

In 1881 the property was transferred to Donald Smith Wallace of Melbourne, who had married Thorn's daughter Ida Australia in 1876. The station was run from 1883 to 1893 by managing partner Reginald Gardiner Casey, who in 1888 married Thorn's granddaughter, Evelyn Jane Harris. Casey was the Member of the Queensland Legislative Assembly for Warrego from 1888 to 1893. Their son, Richard Gavin Gardiner Casey, was to become Governor-General of Australia. Normanby was still running sheep during the Wallace-Casey period.

In 1893, the Wallace-Casey partnership was dissolved and the property passed in 1894 to the Union Mortgage & Agency Co., Ltd, of Australia, and then in 1901 to Australian Estates, who subdivided and sold off the run in the following decade; the first subdivisional sale took place in November 1906. During this period the station was run by a series of managers, and cattle became the principal interest.

The original gateway to the property still stands, opposite the Warrill View State School. None of the earlier outbuildings or the former kitchen wing remains, but some vestiges of the 19th century formal garden are discernible. The house was renovated in the 1960s.

Description 
Normanby Station is located on an eastern slope overlooking Warroolaba Creek and is accessed from the west via a driveway from the town of Warril View. The single-storeyed chamferboard building has a double hipped corrugated iron roof with a central box gutter and is encircled by a skillion roofed verandah. The building has a concrete block and stump base with brick steps.

The east verandah has cast iron balustrade and brackets with a fibrous cement lined raked ceiling and timber floor. French doors with fanlights and screens open onto the verandahs. The northern verandah has been enclosed with weatherboards and casement windows to form a sunroom, kitchen and bedroom. The southern verandah has been enclosed to form a bathroom and office with fibrous cement partitions.

Internally, walls are of painted tongue and groove boards with stained timber doors and architraves. Ceilings are of fibrous cement and floors are covered in carpet and linoleum. Large sliding stained timber doors separate the lounge and dining rooms. The dining room has a fireplace with a timber surround and an arched sash window on either side.

A hall has been inserted behind the southeast bedroom to give access to the bathroom on the south, and the southwest bedroom has been divided into two rooms. The guest room has an ensuite added on the west verandah and the kitchen has been modernised.

A double carport is located to the south, a tennis court to the north and an inground concrete swimming pool to the northeast. The west facade is screened by a vine covered trellis and a twin tankstand is located to the west.

Exclusion of Furniture: The furniture contained within the homestead is expressly excluded from the cultural heritage significance of this place

Heritage listing 
Normanby Homestead was listed on the Queensland Heritage Register on 21 October 1992 having satisfied the following criteria.

The place is important in demonstrating the evolution or pattern of Queensland's history.

Normanby Homestead is important in demonstrating the pattern of Queensland's history because of its association with the early development of pastoralism in the Moreton Bay region, and in West Moreton in particular.

The place demonstrates rare, uncommon or endangered aspects of Queensland's cultural heritage.

It demonstrates rare surviving evidence of 1860s timber construction and plan form in a substantial rural residence.

The place has a special association with the life or work of a particular person, group or organisation of importance in Queensland's history.

Normanby Homestead has a special association with the Thorn family and their contributions, pastoral, political and commercial, to the growth of Queensland in the 19th century.

References

Attribution

External links 

Queensland Heritage Register
Scenic Rim Region
Homesteads in Queensland
Articles incorporating text from the Queensland Heritage Register